Tabaongo is a village in the Bourzanga Department of Bam Province in northern Burkina Faso. It has a population of 641.

References

Populated places in the Centre-Nord Region
Bam Province